Millvale is a settlement between Bessbrook and Newry in County Armagh, Northern Ireland. It is within the townland of Cloghreagh.

The area derives its name from the large number of mills, mainly Linen that were set up in the early 19th century. The Camlough River here provided a quick source of power through water wheels. Most of these have been now demolished, the latest being Baillies Foundry. This was an impressive ruin. A six-storey granite building, originally constructed in 1800 or so. This fell derelict in the late 1960s. Up to its recent demolition it still contained the rusting ruins of all its lathes and machinery.

Places of interest
The main claim to fame of the area is the local public house, the Millvale Arms. This is locally known as the Pit. The story goes that in the late 19th century a cock pit existed to the rear of the pub. Here locals made bets on cockerels fighting in an enclosed pit, thus the name. The Quaker community who set up the neighbouring village of Bessbrook, had a policy called the three P's Policy. This meant, no Pubs, no Police, or no Pawn Shops in the village. As such the Pub in nearby Millvale which was just outside Bessbrook fared very well.
The Old Beetle Mill at Millvale crossroads which was built in 1795 does however remain. This building still stands proud despite closing in 1940.- This was passed for some sort of housing project at the height of the Irish Property Market Bubble, however the project failed and the Mill is starting to deteriorate very badly- The heavy snow falls in Winter 2010 have wreaked havoc on the roof and it is a dangerous place to go near – especially in stormy  weather
Millvale is also well associated with railway history, the 18 arch viaduct of the main Belfast to Dublin railway line is one of the most prominent features of the area (see Craigmore Viaduct). Local legend is that one construction worker died for each arch on the project.
The Doctors Hill in Millvale is also well known. The large old house that stands at the bottom was originally the local Doctors Surgery.
During The Troubles in Northern Ireland, 4 Policemen were killed near the Millvale Crossroads by a remote controlled bomb on 17 April 1979. IRA member Francis Jordan was also killed there in 1975
 A Doctors Surgery was built here in 1848, and the Doctors' Hill name was born, used to be called County Road, and the main road on the cross roads was changed.

References

Villages in County Armagh